Sepak takraw has been included in the Asian Games since the 1990 Asian Games in Beijing, China.

Editions

Events

Medal table

Participating nations

List of medalists

External links
Medallists from previous Asian Games - Sepak takraw

 
Sports at the Asian Games
Asian Games